New Rhodes were a British indie-pop four-piece. The band was formed in 2001 when James, Joe and Jack were students together at college. During their early years the band were based in their hometown Bristol but moved to Hackney, London in 2004.

Career
The band regularly toured the UK and Europe, and tours with the likes of Razorlight, Bloc Party, The Dears, Delays, Hope of the States, The Killers and The Futureheads. helped build a loyal fan base and community. 

They put out seven singles and two albums. Released through Moshi Moshi Records (Hot Chip, Kate Nash, Florence And The Machine, Tom Vek and Architecture in Helsinki) and their own label Salty Cat Records.

In 2005 their second single, "You've Given Me Something That I Can't Give Back", made the UK Top 40, charting at number 38 and In 2006 the band won a 'Vodafone Live Music Award'.

Their line-up was finalised in the summer of 2006 after Desmond became their fourth drummer. Previous drummers included Dave Hounsome (2001-2002), Chun Leek (2002-2003), and Steve Bishop (2003-2006). During their career the band worked with major producers and directors including Paul Epworth, James Ford, Ian Grimble, Rich Wilkinson and Matthias Hoene.

In spring 2010 the band decided to split, playing their final gig at the Fleece & Firkin, Bristol – the same venue they played their first gig in 2001.

Members
 James Williams - Vocals/Guitar
 Joe Gascoigne - Guitar
 Jack Ashdown - Bass/Vocals
 Tim Desmond - Drums/Vocals

Past members:
  Steve Bishop - Drums
  Chun Leek - Drums
  Dave Hounsome - Drums

Discography
"The Life Story of Nelson Scamp" [EP] - CD, Self-released 2002
"I Wish I Was You" [Single] - CD + 7", Moshi Moshi 2004
"You've Given Me Something That I Can't Give Back" [Single] - CD + 7", Moshi Moshi 2005
"From The Beginning" [Single] - CD + 7", Moshi Moshi 2005
"EP" U.S. EP] - CD, So Sweet 2006
"The History of Britain" [Single] - CD + 7", Salty Cat 2006
Songs from the Lodge [Album] - CD, Salty Cat 2006
"Everybody Loves a Scene" [Single] - CD, Salty Cat Records 2009
"The Joys Of Finding And Losing That Girl" [Single] - 7", Salty Cat Records 2009
Everybody Loves a Scene [Album] - CD, Salty Cat Records 2009
"Quando Quando Quando" [Single] - CD, Salty Cat Records 2010

Press clippings
 "Thrilling dancefloor burning stuff" - NME
 "Startlingly fresh and utterly absorbing ... our jaws dropped" - Logo
 "If the demise of painfully hip indie rock has left a void in your world, look no further than New Rhodes ... all the tunes and talent of Casablancas and Co without the pretension. ... So cool it hurts and they don't even know it" - Rocksound
 "Reminds you why you first fell in love with singles" - Sunday Times - Culture Section
 "Great songs that make the Ordinary Boys look ordinary 5/5" - Zoo
 "Perfectly illustrates why we tipped them for stardom way back at the start of the year" - NME

References

External links
http://www.newrhodes.com/ The band's website
https://www.youtube.com/user/newrhodes/ YouTube channel
http://www.facebook.com/pages/New-Rhodes/7565462561/ facebook page
https://open.spotify.com/artist/5re8VeTYmO50AThjKIvVwM?si=zWGxujptSm2KUx80U2bHHw Spotify page
http://www.audiojunkies.net/index.php?option=com_content&task=view&id=51&Itemid=63 Audiojunkies Interview with New Rhodes]

English indie rock groups
Musical groups from Bristol
Moshi Moshi Records artists